Carlos Chardón may refer to:

Carlos A. Chardón López (born 1939), Secretary of the Puerto Rico Department of Education
Carlos E. Chardón (1897–1965), Puerto Rican mycologist and Chancellor of the University of Puerto Rico
Carlos Fernando Chardón (1907–1981), served as the Puerto Rico Adjutant General 1973–1975 and as Secretary of State of Puerto Rico 1969–1973